Unwind is the 2007 debut album from VanVelzen. The album was one of the biggest successes of 2007 in the Netherlands.

Track list
 Unwind
 Baby Get Higher
 Burn
 Waiting For The End
 I'll Stand Tall
 Rise
 Deep
 When Summer Ends
 Chasing The Sun
 Fool For Life
 Shine A Little Light
 Someday
 One Angry Dwarf (Bonustrack)

Charts

Weekly charts

Year-end charts

References

2007 albums